Augustus John Cuthbert Hare (13 March 1834 – 22 January 1903) was an English writer and raconteur.

Early life
He was the youngest son of Francis George Hare of Herstmonceux, East Sussex, and Gresford, Flintshire, Wales, and nephew of Augustus William Hare and Julius Hare. 
Augustus Hare was born in Rome; he was adopted by his aunt, the widow of Augustus Hare, and his parents renounced all further claim to him. His autobiography The Story of My Life (1896-1900) details both a devotion to his adopted mother, Maria, and an intense unhappiness with his home education at Buckwell Place. He spent one year at Harrow School in 1847 but left due to ill health. In 1853, he matriculated at University College, Oxford, graduating in 1857 with a BA.

Career

Hare was the author of a large number of books, which fall into two classes: biographies of members and connections of his family, and descriptive and historical accounts of various countries and cities. To the first belong Memorials of a Quiet Life (about his adoptive mother), Story of Two Noble Lives (about Countess Canning and the Marchioness of Waterford, sisters and artists), The Gurneys of Earlham (about the Gurney family of bankers and social reformers of Earlham Hall near Norwich), and an autobiography in six volumes. This last included a number of accounts of encounters with ghosts. A reviewer in the New York Times concluded that "Mr Hare's ghosts are rather more interesting than his lords or his middle-class people".

He also compiled numerous travel books, including a couple for John Murray, as well as many others under his own name, such as Walks in Rome, Walks in London, Wanderings in Spain, Cities of Northern, Southern, and Central Italy (separate works), Days near Rome and Sussex.

Hare was a friend to the barrister Basil Levett and his wife Lady Mary Levett, the daughter of the Earl of Shaftesbury, to whom Hare left a painting in his will. ("Basil Levett or his wife Lady Margaret Copy of the Last Communion of S Jerome by Domenichino.")

Holmhurst

He spent his money on purchasing and refurbishing a house near Hastings, which he named Holmhurst St Mary.

In his biography of Somerset Maugham, writer Ted Morgan mentions that Hare, whom he refers to as "the last Victorian," befriended Maugham who became a frequent guest at his country house, Holmhurst in Baldslow, Sussex.

After his death, the house was taken by Admiral Sir Lewis Beaumont and family, and then from 1908 Sir John Gordon Kennedy and family. At some point after this the estate was purchased by the Community of the Holy Family, an Anglican order of teaching nuns, with a focus on art and scholarship. Their mother foundress, Agnes Morton, who had formed the community in London in 1896 and later brought it to Sussex, recognised the house and gardens as a piece of Italy – specifically Florence – in England. The girls' school that the nuns ran there, from the 1930s to the 1980s, was known as St Mary's Convent School on the Ridge. Its best-known pupil was Joanna Lumley, an "army brat" who boarded in the 1960s: "I especially loved my second boarding school, an Anglo-Catholic convent in the hills behind Hastings. The nuns wore blue stockings and were brainy and lovely. There were 70 boarders and I was happy as a clam."

Hare died unmarried in 1903, and was buried in Herstmonceux.

List of works
Travel guides:
A Handbook for Travellers in Berks, Bucks and Oxfordshire, (John Murray, 1860)
A Winter at Mentone, (Wertheim, Macintosh & Hunt, 1862)
A Handbook for Travellers in Northumberland and Durham, (John Murray, 1863)
Walks in Rome, (Daldy, Isbister & Co., 1871) 2 vols.
Wanderings in Spain, (Strahan & Co., 1873)
Days Near Rome, (Daldy, Isbister & Co., 1875) 2 vols.
Cities of Northern Italy, (Daldy, Isbister & Co., 1876) 2 vols.
Walks in London, (Daldy, Isbister & Co., 1878) 
Cities of Southern Italy and Sicily, (Smith, Elder & Co., 1883) - Sicily revised in separate volume in 1905 by St. Clair Baddeley
Cities of Central Italy, (Smith, Elder & Co., 1884) 2 vols.
Florence, (Smith, Elder & Co., 1884) 
Venice, (Smith, Elder & Co., 1884) 
Sketches in Holland and Scandinavia, (George Allen, 1885)
Studies in Russia, (Smith, Elder & Co., 1885)
Paris, (Smith, Elder & Co., 1887) 2 vols.
Days Near Paris, (Smith, Elder & Co., 1887) 
South-Eastern France, (George Allen & Unwin, 1890)
South-Western France, (George Allen & Unwin, 1890)
North-Eastern France, (George Allen & Unwin, 1890)
Sussex, (1894)
North-Western France (Normandy and Brittany), (George Allen, 1895)
The Rivieras, (George Allen, 1896)
Shropshire, (George Allen, 1898)

Autobiography:
The Story of My Life, (George Allen, 1896-1900) 6 vols.

Biography:
Memorials of a Quiet Life, (Strahan & Co., 1872–76) 3 vols.
Life and Letters of Frances, Baroness Bunsen, (Daldy, Isbister & Co., 1879) 2 vols.
The Story of Two Noble Lives: being Memorials of Charlotte, Countess Canning, and Louisa, Marchioness of Waterford, (George Allen, 1893) 3 vols.
Life and Letters of Maria Edgeworth, (Edward Arnold, 1894) - as editor
The Gurneys of Earlham, (George Allen, 1895) 2 vols. 
Biographical Sketches: being Memorials of Arthur Penrhyn Stanley, Dean of Westminster, Henry Alford, Dean of Canterbury, Mrs. Duncan Stewart etc., (George Allen, 1895)

Other:
Epitaphs for Country Churchyards. Collected and Arranged, (John Henry & James Parker, 1856)
Letters to Crown-Prince Gustav V (unpublished) - he had conducted the future King on a tour of Rome
Last Will and Testament (unpublished)

Notes

References 
Barnes, Malcolm. Augustus Hare. Victorian Gentleman, (Allen & Unwin, 1985)
Hare, Augustus; Barnes, Malcolm (ed.) In My Solitary Life, (George Allen, 1953)
Hare, Augustus; Barnes, Malcolm (ed.) The Years with Mother, (George Allen, 1952)

External links

 The Augustus Hare Society
 
 
 

1834 births
1903 deaths
19th-century English memoirists
19th-century travel writers
20th-century English people
Writers from Rome
Hare, Augustus John Cuthbert
English travel writers
Hare, Augustus John Cuthbert
Hare, Augustus John Cuthbert
Italian emigrants to the United Kingdom
People from Herstmonceux